Karanovo may refer to:

 Karanovo, Burgas Province, a village in the Aytos municipality, Burgas Province, Bulgaria
 , a village in the Nova Zagora municipality, Sliven Province, Bulgaria; an early Neolithic settlement
 Karanovo culture, a neolithic culture named after Karanovo, Sliven Province